The Dallas Public Library system serves as the municipal library system of the city of Dallas, Texas (USA).

History

In 1899, the idea to create a free public library in Dallas was conceived by the Dallas Federation of Women's Clubs, led by president Mrs. Henry (May Dickson) Exall.  She helped raise US$11,000 from gifts from public school teachers, local businessmen, and Alfred Horatio Belo of The Dallas Morning News.

The library became a reality when Mrs. Exall requested and received a US$50,000 grant from philanthropist and steel giant Andrew Carnegie to construct the first library building in Dallas.  On October 22, 1901, the Carnegie library opened at the corner of Harwood and Commerce streets with a head librarian, three assistants, and 9,852 volumes.  The first story held the entire collection; the second floor held the Carnegie Hall auditorium and an Art Room.  The art room was the first public art gallery in Dallas and eventually became what is known today as the Dallas Museum of Art.

An Oak Cliff branch opened in 1914 to serve the citizens of the area, annexed into Dallas in 1903.  Four more branches opened in the 1930s including the Paul Lawrence Dunbar Library, which was the first to serve the African American population of Dallas. This began under the director of Cleora Clanton.

In World War II, the library was fully established as a War Information Center.  By 1950, the library resources and facilities were stretched to the limit, so supporters formed an auxiliary organization called the Friends of the Dallas Public Library to lobby for better library services.

By the 1950s, the Carnegie Library was badly deteriorating and overcrowded, and a new modern library was built on the same site. During construction, the Library was housed temporarily on the mezzanine of Union Station. The new building, now known as Old Dallas Central Library, had room for over 400,000 volumes and opened in 1954.

Growth: 1960 to 2000

During the 1960s and 1970s, the Dallas Public Library added 17 branches to the system.  In 1962, Lillian M. Bradshaw was named Library Director, the first woman to head a department in the City of Dallas, marking a milestone in the civil rights and women's liberation movements of that era.  Days after she was put into office, she faced a censorship push from a Dallas council-member, but the community and media rallied to her defense.  The City Council, in response, overwhelmingly approved her appointment and passed a resolution not to censor books purchased by the library. By the 1970s, the Central Library had again become overloaded and was unequipped to handle emerging technology. (This was partly a result of the federal Library Services and Construction Act, which had enabled the addition of an unexpected number of volumes to the collection in a relatively short period of time.) In 1972, the City selected a  site at Young and Ervay across from the Dallas City Hall for a new central library facility. In 1982, the technologically sophisticated structure opened its doors.  It was one of the first libraries in the nation to include an Online Public Access Catalog (OPAC) and state-of-the-art audiovisual capabilities.  It was renamed the J. Erik Jonsson Central Library in 1986 in honor of the former mayor who played a large role in the library system's development.

By the 2000s, the system had 27 branch locations with over 2.5 million volumes, including books, magazines, videos, and cassettes.  The system currently attracts 2.8 million visitors per year and has 540,000 cardholders who check out more than 3.8 million books and other materials per year.  The Library also operates a "Library on Wheels" Mobile Learning Center to service Dallas communities.

Historic documents
The Dallas Public Library is home to a copy of Shakespeare's First Folio, the only copy in a US public library outside of New England.  It was purchased by the Dallas Shakespeare Club in 1984 at a cost of $275,000 and was gifted to the Library in 1986.  It is displayed on the 7th floor.

A Dunlap Broadside copy of the Declaration of Independence is also housed on the 7th floor.  Printed by John Dunlap of Philadelphia, it is only one of twenty-five known to survive.  This is the only copy west of the Mississippi, and one of only 3 displayed by a public library.  It was purchased by a number of individuals for $500,000 and given to the city.

Branches

The library operates 27 branch locations throughout the city, and an 8-story main branch, the J. Erik Jonsson Central Library, in the Government District of downtown.  It also operates the Bookmarks Children's Library located in NorthPark Center.
Arcadia Park Branch Library in West Dallas
Audelia Road Branch Library in Lake Highlands
Bachman Lake Branch Library
Dallas West Branch Library in West Dallas
Forest Green Branch Library in Lake Highlands
Fretz Park Branch Library in North Dallas
Grauwyler Park Branch Library in Dallas
Hampton-Illinois Branch Library in Oak Cliff
Highland Hills Branch Library in the Highland Hills neighborhood of South Dallas
Kleberg-Rylie Branch Library in Kleberg in far Southeast Dallas
Lakewood Branch Library in Junius Heights, near Lakewood
Lochwood Branch Library (formerly Casa View Branch) in Lochwood neighborhood of East Dallas, White Rock area
Martin Luther King Jr. Library and Learning Center near Fair Park
Mountain Creek Branch Library in Mountain Creek, Dallas, Texas
North Oak Cliff Branch Library in Oak Cliff
Oak Lawn Branch Library in Oak Lawn
Park Forest Branch Library in North Dallas
Paul Laurence Dunbar Lancaster-Kiest Branch Library in South Dallas
Pleasant Grove Branch Library in Pleasant Grove
Polk-Wisdom Branch Library in Southwest Dallas
Prairie Creek Branch Library
Preston Royal Branch Library in North Dallas
Preston Royal first opened in 1964. Its roof has arches above, and according to Andrew Scoggin of The Dallas Morning News this makes the library appear distinct compared to others in the library system.  there is no funding for a new library building intended to replace the current library.
Renner Frankford Branch Library in Renner in Far North Dallas
Skillman Southwestern Branch Library in East Dallas
 This branch, at 5707 Skillman Street at Southwestern Boulevard, is south of and serves Vickery Midtown. The library opened in July 1996 and received dedication on August 18, 1996. A 1978 bond authorized by Dallas voters lead to the construction of the Skillman Southwestern library. Ramiro Salazar, then the director of the Dallas library system said in 1996 that the opening of Skillman Southwestern satisfied "the needs of a community that didn't have an accessible library for a long time."
Skyline Branch Library in East Dallas
Timberglen Branch Library in Far North Dallas
Vickery Meadows in Northeast Dallas 
White Rock Hills Branch Library in Far East Dallas

The newest Branch, the White Rock Hills Branch, opened June 16, 2012 and received a 2012 APA/GCPD Accessibility Award from the State of Texas.

See also
Libraries in Dallas, Texas

References

External links

Dallas Public Library

Libraries in Dallas
Federal depository libraries
Carnegie libraries in Texas
Public libraries in Texas
Libraries participating in TexShare